Gavros may refer to:

Gavros, Aetolia-Acarnania, a village in the municipal unit Pyllini, Aetolia-Acarnania, Greece
Gavros, Kastoria, an abandoned village in Kastoria regional unit, Greece
Gavros, Trikala, a village in the municipality Kalampaka, Trikala regional unit, Greece
Gavros, a Roman cognomen
Olympiakos F.C., a Greek football club from Piraeus, nicknamed gavros